Eleocharis quinqueflora is a species of spikesedge known by the common names fewflower spikerush and few-flowered spike-rush. It is widespread across Europe, North Africa, northern Asia (Siberia, China, Kazakhstan, Himalayas, etc.), and North America (Canada, Greenland, northern and western US). There are also isolated populations in Argentina and Chile.

Eleocharis quinqueflorais a resident of wet meadows, bogs, hot springs, and other moist places. This is a rhizomatous perennial approaching a maximum height of 40 centimeters. The thin, flattened stems are surrounded by papery reddish to green leaf sheaths and topped with dark inflorescences. The spikelet is lance-shaped to oval and less than a centimeter long. It contains two to seven flowers, each of which is covered with a brown or black bract. The fruit is a yellow-brown achene two or three millimeters long.

References

External links

Jepson Manual Treatment
Photo gallery

quinqueflora
Flora of North America
Flora of Chile
Flora of Argentina
Flora of Europe
Flora of North Africa
Flora of Asia
Plants described in 1767